The 2017 Sheikh Jassim Cup was the 39th edition of the cup competition for football teams from Qatar. It changed from a group staged pre-season tournament featuring all Qatari Stars League sides, to a one-off match between the previous seasons Qatar Stars League winners and Emir of Qatar Cup winners.

Match details

References

2017
2017–18 in Qatari football
2017 domestic association football cups